

The Ambrosini SAI.2 was a light monoplane built in Italy in 1934.  Like the SAI.1, it was designed to participate in the Avioraduno del Littorio rally of 1935.  Compared with that aircraft, the SAI.2's wing area was only 1.4 m2 (15 ft²) less, but the reduction in drag as a result of the monoplane configuration versus that of a biplane resulted in a top speed 20 km/h (12 mph) higher.  Both aircraft used the same engine type.

Despite the similarity in designation, the subsequent SAI.2S was a completely unrelated design.

Specifications

References
 

SAI Ambrosini aircraft
1930s Italian sport aircraft
Low-wing aircraft
Single-engined tractor aircraft
Aircraft first flown in 1934